Hayathabad is a village and panchayat in Ranga Reddy district, Telangana, India. It falls under Shabad mandal. Hythabad is known for its cosmopolitan culture and people celebrate all festivals with joy and peace. A double line road connecting Shamshabad airport and Shabad mandal passes through these village.

The distance from Hythabad to surrounding mandals are in the following range: Shamshabad (23 km), Chevella (18 km), Shadnagar (23 km), Moinabad (23 km) and Shabad  (11 km). 
Recently Many industries are proposed in these region which may gives rise to direct and indirect employment opportunities in these region( Chandanvelly Industrial park).
The nearest popular places are:
1. Amazon Data Centre
2. Kattera group of Industries
3. Welspun group of Industries
4. Various soaps and plastic, paper and papad industries
5. Zilla Parishad High School, Hythabad
6. Sri Ramadhutha swamy ashramam
7. Dargah (Astana-E-Shah-Gulshan)

Places under Hythabad Gram Panchayat
Ankuguda

Hythabad Thanda

Hythabad village

References

Villages in Ranga Reddy district